Arturo Ernesto Reyes Montero (born 8 April 1969) is a Colombian football coach and former player who played as a defender.

As a footballer he began and finished his career at Atlético Bucaramanga starting in 1992 and finishing playing in 2005. He also played in Colombian domestic football for Academia F.C., Atlético Huila, and Unión Magdalena. As a football coach he had spells at Barranquilla F.C., Atlético Bucaramanga, Patriotas Boyacá, and  Atlético Junior, before being appointed to the Colombia youth set up. In July 2018 he led the Colombian team to the gold medal at the 2018 Central American and Caribbean Games beating  Venezuela national under-20 football team 2-1 in the final.

With the departure of José Pékerman following the 2018 FIFA World Cup Reyes was announced as interim manager for the September 2018 friendly matches against Argentina national football team and the Venezuela national football team. He continued as first team coach for the October friendlies against the United States and Costa Rica.

References

1969 births
Living people
Colombian footballers
Colombian football managers
People from Santa Marta
Association football defenders
Atlético Bucaramanga footballers
Atlético Huila footballers
Unión Magdalena footballers
Academia F.C. players
Categoría Primera A players
Categoría Primera B players
Academia F.C. managers
Colombia national football team managers
Categoría Primera A managers
Atlético Junior managers
Sportspeople from Magdalena Department
Colombia national under-20 football team managers